is a town located in Yamagata Prefecture, Japan. , the town had an estimated population of 6,970 in 2354 households, and   a population density of 21 persons per km². In 2008, Iide was selected as one of The Most Beautiful Villages in Japan.

Geography
Iide is located in mountainous southern Yamagata Prefecture, bordered by Fukushima Prefecture to the south. Mount Iide the 2105 meter main peak of the Iide mountain range that spans the Fukushima, Niigata and Yamagata prefectures is on the border of the town, although its peak is actually within Fukushima.

Neighboring municipalities
Yamagata Prefecture
Yonezawa
Nagai
Oguni
Kawanishi
Fukushima Prefecture
Kitakata

Climate
Iide has a Humid continental climate (Köppen climate classification Dfa) with large seasonal temperature differences, with warm to hot (and often humid) summers and cold (sometimes severely cold) winters. Precipitation is significant throughout the year, but is heaviest from August to October. In the winter season, snow cover may exceed 2 meters even in the center of town due to the monsoon from the Sea of Japan.

Demographics
Per Japanese census data, the population of Iide peaked in the 1950s, and is now considerably less than what it was a century ago.

History
The area of present-day Iide was part of ancient Dewa Province. After the start of the Meiji period, most of the area of Iide became part of Nishiokitama District, Yamagata Prefecture, with the establishment of the modern municipalities system. The village of Iide was established on October 1, 1954 by the merger of the villages of Toyohara, Sogawa and Toyokawa. It was elevated to town status on September 1, 1958 after merging with the village of Nakatsugawa from Minamiokitama District.

Economy
The economy of Iide is based on agriculture. About half of the Yonezawa beef originates from this town. The town is also noted for the brewing of nigori sake.

Education
Iide has four public elementary schools and one public middle school operated by the town government. The town does not have a high school.

Transportation

Railway
 East Japan Railway Company -  Yonesaka Line
 -  -

Highway

References

External links

Official Website 

 
Towns in Yamagata Prefecture